Wilmington, DE 2001 is a live album released by the band Widespread Panic on February 23, 2010. It was recorded live at Kahuna Summer Stage in Wilmington, Delaware on July 22, 2001 and released as a two-track, sound board recording for the band's project, "Porch Songs". This performance serves as the third installment of the project.

The performance marked the first time the Bob Dylan/Jimi Hendrix classic All Along the Watchtower was performed live by the band.

Track listing

Disc 1
Glory  (Widespread Panic) - 5:35
C. Brown  (Widespread Panic) - 5:51
Give  (Widespread Panic) - 4:41
Diner  (Widespread Panic) - 13:39
Rebirtha  (Widespread Panic) - 7:47
Blackout Blues  (Widespread Panic) - 7:28
E on a G  (Widespread Panic) - 3:43
Dirty Business  (John Dawson) - 9:36
All Time Low  (Widespread Panic) - 4:17

Disc 2
Swamp  (David Byrne / Chris Frantz / Jerry Harrison / Tina Weymouth) - 6:30
1 x 1  (John Hermann) - 5:37
Sleepy Monkey  (Widespread Panic) - 10:02
Stop Breakin' Down Blues  (Robert Johnson) - 6:44
Party At Your Mama's House  (Widespread Panic) - 7:19
Red Hot Mama  (George Clinton/Eddie Hazel/Bernie Worrell) - 12:48
Drums  (Widespread Panic) - 20:33

Disc 3
The Last Straw  (Widespread Panic) - 7:17
All Along the Watchtower  (Bob Dylan) - 5:59
Travelin' Light  (J.J. Cale) - 7:08
Old Joe  (Widespread Panic)  (Encore)- 3:47
North  (Jerry Joseph)  (Encore)- 6:22

Personnel

 John "JB" Bell - Vocals, Guitar
 Michael Houser - Guitar, Vocals
 Dave Schools - Bass
 Todd Nance - Drums
 John "Jojo" Hermann - Keyboards, Vocals
 Domingo "Sunny" Ortiz - Percussion

References

External links
Widespread Panic website
Everyday Companion

2010 live albums
Widespread Panic live albums